Crossocheilus, also known as the fringe barbs, flying foxes, or "algae eaters", is a genus of fish in the family Cyprinidae. It is distributed in China, India, Indonesia, Malaysia and Thailand in Asia. These fish occur in several types of habitat, often fast-flowing rivers with rocky bottoms.

Species 
There are currently 11 recognized species in this genus:
 Crossocheilus atrilimes Kottelat, 2000
 Crossocheilus cobitis (Bleeker, 1854)
 Crossocheilus elegans Kottelat & H. H. Tan, 2011 
 Crossocheilus gnathopogon M. C. W. Weber & de Beaufort, 1916
 Crossocheilus langei Bleeker, 1860
 Crossocheilus microstoma Ciccotto & Page, 2017
 Crossocheilus nigriloba Popta, 1904
 Crossocheilus oblongus Kuhl & van Hasselt, 1823 
 Crossocheilus obscurus H. H. Tan & Kottelat, 2009 
 Crossocheilus pseudobagroides (Duncker, 1904)
 Crossocheilus reticulatus (Fowler, 1934)
 Crossocheilus tchangi (Fowler, 1935)

References 

 
Cyprinidae genera
Cyprinid fish of Asia
Taxa named by Johan Conrad van Hasselt